In linear algebra, Wilkinson matrices are symmetric, tridiagonal, order-N matrices with pairs of nearly, but not exactly, equal eigenvalues. It is named after the British mathematician James H. Wilkinson. For N = 7, the Wilkinson matrix is given by

Wilkinson matrices have applications in many fields, including scientific computing, numerical linear algebra, and signal processing.

References

Matrices
Numerical linear algebra